Woodbridge Strikers Soccer Club is a Canadian semi-professional soccer club based in Woodbridge, Ontario. The club was founded in 1976 as a youth soccer club and added its semi-professional club in League1 Ontario in 2014. The team plays home games at Vaughan Grove Park.

The club was one of the ten original founding men's teams in League1 Ontario, which was established in 2014, as well as one of eight original founding teams in the League1 Ontario women's division, which was established in 2015.

History
The club's history dates back to 1972, when the East Woodbridge Soccer Club and West Woodbridge Soccer Club were created to serve the Woodbridge Community. In 1976, these two clubs merged to form Woodbridge Soccer Club.

In 2014, the semi-professional club was established to play in the newly formed League1 Ontario as one of the founding members.

Woodbridge played their first match on June 1, 2014 against ANB Futbol, which they won 2–1. They finished in second place in the league in each of their first two seasons.

In 2015, Woodbridge won the League1 Ontario League Cup, defeating Sigma FC 2–1 in the finals. They repeated as champions in the 2017 League1 Ontario League Cup with a 3–1 victory over Vaughan Azzurri in the finals.  They lost in the 2017 League1 Championship final to the Oakville Blue Devils in a penalty shoot-out, narrowly missing out on the opportunity to represent the league in the 2018 Canadian Championship as a result. They again lost in the 2018 Playoff Final, this time against Vaughan Azzurri, missing out on the Canadian Championship for the second consecutive year.

They added a women's club to participate in the inaugural season of the League1 Ontario women's division in 2015. In their debut season, they finished second in the league. In 2018, the women won their first trophy, capturing the League Cup. In 2021, the women captured their first League1 Championship, defeating Blue Devils FC 1-0 in the finals.

Coaching staff 

Head coach – Peter Pinizzotto 
Boys technical director – Marco Reda
Technical advisor – Paul Stalteri
Goalkeeping coach – Roberto Stillo

Seasons

Men

Women

Notable former players
The following players have either played at the professional or international level, either before or after playing for the League1 Ontario team:

Men

Women

Honours
L1O Cup (1): 2015, 2017

References

External links

Association football clubs established in 2014
Soccer clubs in Ontario
League1 Ontario teams
2015 establishments in Ontario
Sport in Vaughan